Maanikya is a 2014 Indian Kannada-language action drama film directed by Sudeepa featuring himself, V. Ravichandran, Ranya Rao, Ramya Krishna, Varalaxmi Sharathkumar and P. Ravi Shankar in the lead roles. The film is a remake of 2013 Telugu film Mirchi. It was released on 1 May 2014. Upon its release, Maanikya got an excellent response from the critics and audience  and had a good run at the box office. The satellite rights of the movie was sold for a huge amount. The film was later dubbed into Hindi under the same name by RKD Studios in 2015.  Plot
The movie begins with a girl collecting funds for an organisation in Singapore. A goon gives her money and then chases her at night when she goes home.  Then Vijay (Sudeepa), enters and resolves the conflict without fighting. The girl introduces herself as Manasa (Ranya Rao). They slowly become friends. But one day she asks Vijay to leave her and go as she fears that if their relationship develops any further, separation would be painful. He then goes back to India and influences Manasa's brother to a large extent. In his conservative and ancestral village, Vijay changes everyone's viewpoint and makes them more lovable.

Eventually Manasa expresses her love for him, but Vijay hesitates. It is then revealed that he was born to their rival's family. His father (V. Ravichandran) wanted to change the people of his village. But his mother Lavanya (Ramya Krishna) didn't want to stay there, so she left him. When Vijay goes there, he falls in love with Sindhu (Varalaxmi Sarathkumar).

He starts taking revenge on the Manasa's family without revealing his identity. Then they decide to marry Vijay with Sindhu because they both are in love with each other. During the marriage the Inspector tells his father that the enmity is rekindling because his son is taking revenge on the rivals. Soon afterwards, the rivals come and start killing everyone. After the fight it is known that Vijay's mother dies. His father banishes him and blames her death on him. The story is now back to the present. Manasa's uncle, Beera (P. Ravi Shankar) challenges Vijay that if he can defeat his men then he too would follow non violence. After successfully defeating them, her uncle asks Vijay that if he could defeat the rival's son (not knowing that it was Vijay himself) he would marry Manasa to Vijay.

Vijay gets angry at his stubbornness and reveals his true identity. He starts fighting with Manasa's brother. Then all her family members come and convert him too. This was watched by his father who had just arrived there. His father welcomes him back to the family. The film ends with him reuniting with Sindhu.

Cast

 Sudeepa as Vijay
 Ravichandran as Adishesha
 Ranya Rao as Manasa
 Varalaxmi Sharathkumar as Sindhu
 Ramya Krishna as Lavanya
 P. Ravi Shankar as Beera
 Shobaraj as Bhadra
 Ashok as Ugrappa
 Padma Vasanthi as Lakshmi
 Avinash
 Vijayakumar
 Sadhu Kokila as Veera Pratapa Simha
 Sharan
 Rekha Krishnappa as Manasa's mother
 Chitra Shenoy as Rathna
 Sathyajith as Bheema
 Tennis Krishna as Nagappa
 Veena Sundar as Fathima
 Komal Gandhi as Vijay's friend
 Rahul Salanke as Yogi
 Kiran Rathod in item number "Pantara Panta"
 Shweta Pandit in item number "Pantara Panta"
 Rishika Singh in item number "Pantara Panta"

Production

Development
After the success of his previous venture, Bachchan, Sudeepa was met with lot of offers from various south film directors. However, he announced in his social network site that he would be teaming up with ace actor – director V. Ravichandran in his next venture. It was reported that Sudeepa would be directing Ravichandran for his next film. Later in July 2013, it was speculated that Ravichandran would be playing father to Sudeepa and the film may be a remake of 2013 Telugu film Mirchi which starred Prabhas and Satyaraj in the son – father roles respectively. It was later confirmed that the story is tweaked and Ravichandran would be playing the father role to Sudeepa and Ramya Krishna would be his pair.

Title
Sudeepa profusely thanked veteran Dwarakish for suggesting the title Maanikya.

Filming
The filming of the film commenced from August 2013 at a Bangalore city college. Major portions of the film is shot at Bidar(a crown city of karnataka) and Hyderabad. The film unit also flew to Bangkok to film a song sequence and few action sequences.

Soundtrack

The soundtrack of the album was released on 29 March 2014.

Release and responseMaanikya'' was released in around 250 screens on 1 May 2014. And also released on 15 May 2014 in Sharjah, on 16 May 2014 in Dubai and Abu Dhabi. Maanikya is the first Kannada film released in Oman and Bahrain and released on 30 May 2014. Maanikya also released in United States on 30 May 2014  and in Perth, Australia on 17 August 2014  Maanikya is the first Kannada film screened in Indian Film Festival of Ireland and screened on 20 September 2014

Box office

Maanikya completed 100 days on 8 August 2014.

Critical reception
 Bangalore mirror gave the film 3.5/5 stars saying "It's a near-perfect mix of action, drama, romance and comedy. In a line, it's the story of a scion of a family to bring together two warring families. However, it is not as simple as that. The film meddles with multiple genres —from romance to action to comedy to family drama to something more. The plot of the film matches its length, the narration and the twists keep the audience glued. Credit should go to director Sudeep for packing every available slot with good actors. The film is a real ensemble. There are top-notch actors everywhere."
 Chitraloka gave the film 3.75/5 stars and called it a complete family entertainer and further said "Maanikya comes as a cool breeze for the summer. It is the perfect holiday gift from Sudeep and team. It has all the masala elements that a commercial film demands. There are so many things in Maanikya but all of them are perfectly placed. It is a film you will love to watch in a cool big screen theatre. This is one film you should reserve a day for this week."
 One India gave the film 3.5/5 stars and said "Maanikya, which is the first combination of Abhinaya Chakravarthy Kichcha Sudeep and Sandalwood's ace actor Crazy Star Ravichandran, has got a grand opening across the state, and will be a biggest treat for the long weekend. Sudeep looks superb in action, comedy, dance and sentimental sequence. It is Kiccha, who steals the show."
 Times of India gave 4/5 stars and said "Armed with a good script, the director has taken care to see that the narration does not lag at any point. The story moves fast and almost all the major characters have equal share of work to do. With a long list of senior artistes, Sudeep has succeeded in giving them the right roles."
 Deccan Herald gave the film 3/5 stars and said: "Fans will surely have no complaints with Maanikya."
 Sharadhaa from the India express called Maanikya a Refreshing Treat for Sudeep's Fans, saying "Sudeep has pulled off the film credibly as a director and actor but looks a bit tired at times probably because of the huge responsibility he undertook.  He is excellent in scenes when he shows the human frailty of his character. A role only matched by Ravichandran  as the father. With writing by Koratala Siva, a good supporting cast combined with Arjun Janya’s music, cinematography by Shekhar Chandra and Sudeep’s over all effort, the film has turned out to be a good family entertainer."
 Shashiprasad from the Deccan Chronicle said "What happens when Crazy Star V. Ravichandran and Kichcha Sudeep come together on big screen for the first time? 'Entertainment' at its best would be the simplest answer to it. When nobody could imagine the evergreen lover of sandalwood shifting his gear down for a 'fathrer' role, Maanikya is a well crafted remake of the hit Telugu movie Mirchi. Crazy, Kichcha shine in yet another 'remake'."

Other revenues
The film did  of business before its release by the (satellite-dubbing-audio-DVD-other) rights.

Meanwhile, Tamil, Telugu and Malayalam dubbing rights for  each.

References

External links
 
 
 
 

2014 films
2014 action drama films
Kannada remakes of Telugu films
2010s Kannada-language films
Films scored by Arjun Janya
Films shot in Bangkok
Indian action drama films
Films about violence
Films shot in Bangalore
Films shot in Karnataka